Sorsavesi is a rather bigmedium-sized lake in the southeast of Finland, partly in the region Southern Savonia and partly in Northern Savonia. It belongs to Vuoksi main catchment area.

See also
List of lakes in Finland

References

Lakes of Leppävirta
Lakes of Pieksämäki